Florent Barle (born 17 January 1986 in Cavaillon) is a French former road cyclist. He rode in the 2012 Vuelta a España and finished in 129th place.

Major results
2004
 5th Overall Tour du Pays de Vaud
1st Points classification
2008
 2nd Overall Grand Prix Chantal Biya
 8th Paris–Mantes-en-Yvelines
2009
 6th Overall Tour de Gironde
1st Stage 3
 6th Overall Tour Alsace
2010
 1st Overall Tour des Pyrénées
 7th Overall Tour Alsace

References

1986 births
Living people
French male cyclists
People from Cavaillon
Sportspeople from Vaucluse
Cyclists from Provence-Alpes-Côte d'Azur